This is a list of fictional badgers. Badgers are short-legged omnivores in the weasel family, Mustelidae. The personality and behavior of the real badger has greatly informed the development of personality and characteristics of the badger character in fiction. Specifically, authors of fictional works employing badgers have often emphasized their natural reclusive privacy and their ferocity and courage when protecting themselves (this aspect drawing its origins from the early tradition of badger-baiting).

The badger's role as a character in fiction can be traced back to the folklore of Europe and Asia where their nocturnal habits have given them an air of mystery. In Chinese and Japanese folklore, the badger character is a shapeshifter. In European folklore the badger character is intimately associated with the bear and is considered a forecaster of the arrival of spring. Older versions of these stories ascribed similar powers to the bear, but as bear populations dwindled, the folklore shifted to use the badger (in Germany and England), and the groundhog (in the United States). In England, the badger character has been adopted in many quarters as a mascot—an evolution from the historic practice of using the badger in heraldic design.

Anthropomorphic badgers have frequently appeared in children's literature, although their personalities have never settled in one particular manner. Characters like Beatrix Potter's Tommy Brock represent the negative side of badgers and reflect the farmer's view of the real badger as a predator of small livestock. On the other hand, characters like Kenneth Grahame's gruff and ascetic Mr. Badger or Susan Varley's Badger (Badger's Parting Gifts) represent the positive side of badgers and reflect the real badgers' purposeful privacy in a way that allows authors to project human characteristics on them. Rural Economy and Land Use Programme fellow, Dr. Angela Cassidy, has noted that the literary figure of the "good badger" has become dominant since the early 20th century, but that more recently the figure of the "bad badger" (now a verminous character usually defined by stench and disease) has made a slight resurgence. Children's book critic, Amanda Craig, has also noted a modern trend away from any instances of the badger character in literature and has identified the lessening of interaction between humans and badgers in modern times as the underlying cause.

In more recent years fictional badger characters have become increasingly abstract, with thoroughly human characteristics and only the appearance of the badger. Indeed, Dr. Cassidy has noted that since 1990, the tendency with badger characters has "accelerated into surrealism and comedy" with the most prominent example being the "Badger Badger Badger" meme arising online in 2003. Modern badger characters have shown up in numerous visual media including animation, commercials, live-action film, the internet, and in video games.

Badgers in mythology and religion
 Mujina, shapeshifting badger in Japanese mythology

Badgers in literature, poetry, and comics
 Archibald "Archie" LeBrock, a British anthropomorphic badger who is the main character of the 2009 graphic novel series Grandville by Bryan Talbot.
 Badger, a character from One Snowy Night and Percy the Park Keeper by Nick Butterworth
 Badger, Shadow, and Frond, from the children's novel The Animals of Farthing Wood and its components The Fox Cub Bold and Battle for the Park all by Colin Dann.
 Badger, the title character in Susan Varley's Badger's Parting Gifts, a Mother Goose Award-winning children's story that was showcased on Reading Rainbow in season 18.
 Badger, from Roald Dahl's Fantastic Mr. Fox.
 The badger that Arthur meets when he is transformed into a badger by Merlin in The Sword in the Stone (collected into The Once and Future King).
 "Badger", poem by John Clare
 Badger Lords and Ladies of Salamandastron in the Redwall book series by Brian Jacques
 The badgers from The Disgusting Sandwich by Gareth Edwards and Hannah Shaw
 The badgers from Stinkbomb & Ketchup-Face and the Badness of Badgers by John Dougherty
 The old male badger from Brock by Anthony McGowan
 The mother badger from Incident at Hawk's Hill.
 Bill Badger, friend of Rupert Bear in the Rupert Bear comic strips, originally created by Mary Tourtel
 Bill Badger in the Bill Badger series (1957-1969) by Denys Watkins-Pitchford
 Boomer Badger from the magazine Ranger Rick.
 Brock the Badger in The Epic of Brock the Badger (1960) by Henry Williamson
 Brock the Badger in Yours Ever, Sam Pig by Alison Uttley
 Brock and his family from E. H. Shepard's Ben and Brock
 "The Combe", a 1917 poem by Edward Thomas
 Frances, a preschool-aged badger in a seven-book series by Russell Hoban
 Hazel from Hazel's Amazing Mother by Rosemary Wells
 James Barkley from the first issue of The Adventures of Sly Cooper
 Meles Brock, Esq. from the Owlglass chronicles by Will Nickless
 Mr. Badger, in The Wind in the Willows by Kenneth Grahame (1908), and later sequels such as The Willows at Christmas by William Horwood
 Mr. Badger, the main character in "Mr. Badger to the Rescue"
 Old Brock, a badger from the tale of "El-ahrairah and the Lendri", and the lendri seen near the river (Ch 7), in Watership Down.
 Tommy Brock from The Tale of Mr. Tod (1912) - Kidnaps the Flopsy Bunnies and gets into a scuffle with Mr. Tod.
 Trufflehunter is a talking badger from C. S. Lewis's Chronicles of Narnia series, particularly Prince Caspian.
 Martin Badger, from The Love of Simon Fox, by Jonathan Schork (sms2, 2016), introduced in chapter 6 as an unnamed, ill-mannered, semi-wild beast, returns in chapter 7 with "a cane & good manners", and emerges as one of the heroic, ferociously loyal characters of the book.
 The Badger-folk in J. R. R. Tolkien's The Adventures of Tom Bombadil
 Midnight the Badger, from the Warriors novel series.
 Badger, one of the titular characters from the Skunk And Badger book series by Amy Timberlake.

Badgers in animated movies and TV series
 Badger from Bodger and Badger
 The badger that launches an attack on all humans and nearly disembowels Homer in "A Tale of Two Springfields", an episode of The Simpsons.
 Clive Badger, Mr. Fox's lawyer voiced by Bill Murray in the 2009 Wes Anderson film Fantastic Mr. Fox
 Dante, the racist badger from "The Strange Tale of the Crack Fox" from The Mighty Boosh
 Edwina Badger, appeared in Bear in the Big Blue House. She is a musician who also goes by the name "The Great Bandini". She was voiced by Whoopi Goldberg.
 Leesdas, a badger from the Dutch educational puppet show with the same name.
 Mr. Badger, a badger from several film adaptations of Kenneth Grahame's The Wind in the Willows, including The Adventures of Ichabod and Mr. Toad (1949), The Wind in the Willows (1983), The Wind in the Willows (1987), Wind in the Willows (1988), The Wind in the Willows (1984 TV series), and Oh, Mr. Toad
 Mr. Digger, a minor character in the Walt Disney Animation movie The Fox and the Hound. An old badger who hates animals barging into his home.
 Sticks the Badger, a supporting character in the animated series Sonic Boom.
 Badgerclops, one of the main characters from the Cartoon Network animated series Mao Mao: Heroes of Pure Heart.
 Egbert, the main antagonist of the animated series Poppy Cat.
 Cornelius the inventor, and his niece, Michelle whose poisoning propels the plot and the protagonists' quest in the Hanna Barbera 1993 movie Once Upon A Forest.
 Several badgers were featured in British comedian Harry Hill's 1996 TV programme Saturday Live. The badgers (glove puppets) were expected to take part in a badger parade -- somehow always averted. The named badgers included Gareth Southgate Badger, Tasmin Archer Badger, Jools Holland Badger, Windsor Davies Badger, Gazza Badger, and Michael Owen Badger. There were also several unnamed badgers.

Badgers in tabletop, card, and video games
 Captain Bayback, Bronco, Sery, Grandpa Ruskin, Chubb Chubb, and Pup, from the Wales Interactive release Gravity Badgers
 Gulo, the rare golden honey badger of the Kyrat region of Far Cry 4, as well as the nameless badgers in the Oros region of Far Cry Primal and honey badgers in the Kyrat and Oros regions of Far Cry 4 and Far Cry Primal.

Badgers in music and spoken word
 The badgers from the Badger Badger Badger internet meme and the badger from the Badger phone internet meme.
 Chunt, a shapeshifter in the popular podcast Hello from the Magic Tavern, is most commonly in the form of a Badger.

See also
 Badger (disambiguation)#Fictional characters - other non-badger characters named Badger
 List of fictional animals
 List of miscellaneous fictional animals - including some fictional hyraxes (which are translated as badgers in the King James Bible)
 Badger Badger Badger
 Hufflepuff - One of the four houses of Hogwarts School of Witchcraft and Wizardry in the Harry Potter series has a badger mascot. The mascot features on the school's coat of arms.

References

Badgers